Giuseppe "Beppe" Carletti (born August 12, 1946) is an Italian musician, founder and keyboardist of the band I Nomadi.

Career 
Carletti was born in Novi di Modena, Emilia-Romagna.

He founded the Nomadi at the age of sixteen, together with Augusto Daolio, Franco Midili, Leonardo Manfredini, Gualtiero Gelmini and Antonio Campari. After Daolio's death, he remained the sole founder member still active with the band.

Carletti has always distinguished for his humanitarian and social engagement. He founded a hospital in Cambodia and Vietnam where girls victims of slavery were helped.

On February 18, 2005, Daolio's birthday, he was named Knight of Italian Republic by president Carlo Azeglio Ciampi.

His favourite football team is Juventus.

See also 
I Nomadi

References

1946 births
Living people
Musicians from the Province of Modena